{{DISPLAYTITLE:NZR NA class}}

The NZR NA class was a class of two steam locomotives that operated on the privately owned Wellington and Manawatu Railway (WMR) and then the publicly owned New Zealand Railways (NZR). Ordered by the WMR to operate on its line up the west coast of the North Island north of Wellington, the first was built in 1894 by the Baldwin Locomotive Works and entered service that year as WMR No. 14.  In 1896, a second locomotive that was slightly more powerful was ordered from Baldwin, and it entered service in October 1897. The engines were similar to the two members of the N class ordered in 1891, except they were heavier and more powerful. They were Vauclain compound locomotives.

In 1908, the WMR was incorporated into the national network and the government's Railways Department reclassified the engines as the sole members of the NA class: No. 14 became NA 459 and No. 15 became NA 460.  They operated for roughly another two decades; NA 459 spent its final days working in Frankton near Hamilton and was withdrawn from service in March 1929, while NA 460's last depot was Cross Creek at the Wairarapa end of the Rimutaka Incline and it was withdrawn in July 1929.

External links
New Zealand steam locomotives — NA class
Drawing of an NA class locomotive by Derek Brown

References

Bibliography 

 
 
 

Na class
2-6-2 locomotives
Baldwin locomotives
Vauclain compound locomotives
Scrapped locomotives
Railway locomotives introduced in 1894
3 ft 6 in gauge locomotives of New Zealand